2016 Re-Album (stylised as 2016 are-ALBUM) is a compilation album by the South Korean boy band Sechs Kies. It was released on December 1, 2016, under YG Entertainment. This marks the group's first official release since their compilation album, Blue Note, in 2000. It also marked the group's first official release under YG, and the first without member Ko Ji Yong, who chose not to participate in the group's reunion activities.

Overview 
Due to the inaccessibility of previous Sechskies releases, YG in-house producers Rovin, Airplay, Future Bounce and Kang Ukjin, recomposed and compiled previous Sechskies songs.

The music videos were filmed during winter in Sapporo, Japan.

Background 
On May 11, 2016, five of the six members of Sechs Kies signed with YG Entertainment. Shortly after "Three Words" was released on October 7, 2016, marking their first comeback since their disbandment. On November 23, 2016, YG Entertainment released a teaser, revealing the album's title. The only songs performed before the official release of the album were Com' Back and Couple in the end of the year Melon music Awards.

On December 2, the album along with its music video for the lead single "Couple" were released.

Track listing

Personnel 
Liner credit notes as seen in the booklet of the physical album.

Eun Jiwon – vocals, rap
Kang Sunghun – vocals
Kim Jaeduck – vocals, rap
Lee Jaijin – vocals, rap
Jang Suwon – vocals

References

External links 

Sechs Kies albums
2016 albums
YG Entertainment albums